Telluric acid, or more accurately Orthotelluric acid, is a chemical compound with the formula , often written as . It is a white crystalline solid made up of octahedral  molecules which persist in aqueous solution. In the solid state, there are two forms, rhombohedral and monoclinic, and both contain octahedral  molecules, containing one hexavalent tellurium (Te) atom in the +6 oxidation state, attached to six hydroxyl (–OH) groups, thus, it can be called tellurium(VI) hydroxide. 
Telluric acid is a weak acid which is dibasic, forming tellurate salts with strong bases and hydrogen tellurate salts with weaker bases or upon hydrolysis of tellurates in water. It is used as tellurium-source in the synthesis of oxidation catalysts.

Preparation
Telluric acid is formed by the oxidation of tellurium or tellurium dioxide with a powerful oxidising agent such as hydrogen peroxide, chromium trioxide or sodium peroxide.

Crystallization of telluric acid solutions below 10 °C gives telluric acid tetrahydrate .
It is an  oxidising agent, as shown by the electrode potential for the reaction below, although it is kinetically slow in its oxidations.
, Eo = +1.02 V
Chlorine, by comparison, is +1.36 V and selenous acid is +0.74 V in oxidizing conditions.

Properties and reactions
The anhydrous acid is stable in air at 100 °C but above this it dehydrates to form polymetatelluric acid, a white hygroscopic powder (approximate composition ), and allotelluric acid, an acid syrup of unknown structure (approximate composition ).

Strong heating at over 300 °C produces the α crystalline modification of tellurium trioxide, α-.
 Reaction with diazomethane gives the hexamethyl ester, .

Telluric acid and its salts mostly contain hexacoordinate tellurium. This is true even for salts such as magnesium tellurate, which is isostructural with magnesium molybdate and contains  octahedra.

Other forms of telluric acid
Metatelluric acid, the tellurium analogue of sulfuric acid, is unknown.

Other tellurium acids
Tellurous acid , containing tellurium in its +4 oxidation state, is known but not well characterised.
Hydrogen telluride is an unstable gas that forms hydrotelluric acid upon addition to water.

References

Hydroxides
Tellurates
Oxidizing acids
Oxidizing agents